Lucie Smutná (born ) is a Czech female volleyball player, playing as a setter. She is part of the Czech Republic women's national volleyball team. On club level she plays for CSM Volei Alba Blaj since the summer of 2018.

She competed at the 2015 Women's European Volleyball Championship. She participated in the 2014 FIVB Volleyball World Grand Prix, and in the 2016 FIVB Volleyball World Grand Prix.

References

1991 births
Living people
Expatriate volleyball players in Germany
Czech women's volleyball players
Czech expatriate sportspeople in France
Czech expatriate sportspeople in Italy
Czech expatriate sportspeople in Romania
Czech expatriate sportspeople in Germany
Czech expatriate sportspeople in Turkey
Expatriate volleyball players in Romania
Expatriate volleyball players in France
Expatriate volleyball players in Italy
Expatriate volleyball players in Turkey
Setters (volleyball)